Aboyne Curling Pond railway station, Loch of Aboyne Platform or Curlers' Platform was a private station opened on the Deeside Extension Railway for the use of the curlers, who played on the nearby Loch of Aboyne close to the old Deeside Railway that ran from Aberdeen (Joint) to Ballater.

History 
The station was opened by 1891 on the Deeside Extension Railway that became part of the GNoSR and at grouping merged with the London and North Eastern Railway. It was closed to curlers prior to 1925. The line itself has been lifted and this section forms part of the Deeside Way long-distance footpath.

Aboyne was not unique in having a dedicated private curlers' railway station as at least one other existed at Loch Parks, named Drummuir Curlers' Platform on the Keith and Dufftown Railway. Loch Leven station was frequently used for curling matches.

Aboyne Curling Club
The loch is artificial, created by the Aboyne Castle estate. On 9 February 1891 he Aberdeen Free Press advertised a special train from Aberdeen along the Deeside line to the Loch of Aboyne Platform for a bonspiel on the 10 February between curlers from the south and north of the River Don. In 1908 the club is recorded as meeting annually at the Loch of Aboyne and that the loch was used for curling from at least 1870. The club was active in 1915, the year when it is recorded to have organised a concert to raise money for the war effort. The club no longer exists. The site was also known as St Katherine's Loch.

Infrastructure
The 1899 OS map shows the single short station platform that was located on the northern or loch side of this single track section of the branch not far from Rosepark Cottage. The platform was made of railway timbers as was the substantial revetment behind. A path led to the eastern end of the platform and a pedestrian crossing was present that also gave direct access to the loch. No indication of the halt is indicated on OS maps in 1929.

Services
Apart from advertised events the station was not listed on timetables and the sport had a very seasonal and unpredictable requirement for train services.

The site today 
The foundations of the platform survive. The Royal Deeside Railway is located at Milton of Crathes some distance down the line towards Aberdeen.

See also
Carsbreck railway station
Drummuir Curlers' Platform railway station

References

Sources
 
 Maxtone, Graham and Cooper, Mike (2018). Then and Now on the Great North. V.1. GNoSR Association. .

External links 
Aboyne Curlers' Platform
Film of the station's site and the Deeside line

Disused railway stations in Aberdeenshire
Former Great North of Scotland Railway stations
Railway stations in Great Britain opened in 1891
Railway stations in Great Britain closed in 1925
Former private railway stations